Sarah Beale is an English female rugby union player. She represented  at the 2010 Women's Rugby World Cup.
Beale made her test debut in 2007 and before that represented England Students in 2003, the Academy the following year and England A in 2005.
In 2010, Beale was diagnosed with muscular cancer, after a successful surgery she proved herself and was selected to play in the 2010 Women's Rugby World Cup.

In 2018, Beale achieved her goal of competing at her second World Championship level event, at the 70.3 Ironman World Championships in Port Elizabeth, South Africa.

References

External links

1984 births
Living people
England women's international rugby union players
English female rugby union players
Female rugby union players
Rugby union players from Cambridge
21st-century English women